Cakewalk is a 2019 Hindi short film directed by Ram Kamal Mukherjee and produced by Aritra Das under the banner of Assorted Motion Pictures.It starred Esha Deol, Tarun Malhotra, Anindita Bose, Siddhartha Chatterjee and Dimple Acharyaa in the lead role. The film was released on 2019.

Cast
 Esha Deol
 Tarun Malhotra
 Anindita Bose
 Siddhartha Chatterjee
 Dimple Acharyaa

References

External links

Indian short films
2019 short films